Antonio Maria Camalda (1601–1690) was a Roman Catholic prelate who served as Bishop of Strongoli (1663–1690).

Biography
Antonio Maria Camalda was born in 1601 in Belvedere, Italy.
On 2 Jul 1663, he was appointed during the papacy of Pope Alexander VII as Bishop of Strongoli.
He served as Bishop of Strongoli until his death in Dec 1690.

References

External links and additional sources
 (for Chronology of Bishops) 
 (for Chronology of Bishops) 

17th-century Italian Roman Catholic bishops
Bishops appointed by Pope Alexander VII
1601 births
1609 deaths